Taylor High School is a senior high school in Taylor, Michigan. It is in the Taylor School District.
The name is a reference to the city where it is located.

History

The school was created in 2018 as a merger of two previous schools, Kennedy High School and  Truman High School. A new mascot and school colours were chosen as a compromise between the two previous school identities. The district used the former Truman building since it was newer, had a bigger capacity, and was in a better condition.

It was started in 1973 as a joint Senior School and Middle School. The initial school real plant has been designed utilising the Open School thought, which meant they had classrooms with no walls but after a few years of operating with that theory and also a configuration as being a joint senior/middle faculty, Taylor School District leaders chose to improve the college to some standalone large faculty. In addition, district leaders began the practice of installing walls within the construction, creating an individual classroom which is still the present school configuration now. Truman Senior School was Taylor Senior High School in Fall 2018, Following a Spring 2018 close of Kennedy Senior High School. On account of the closing, Kennedy's 2017 18 freshman class was moved to Truman High School. As part of this renaming, faculty colours are changed to black and white gold, and also the sports teams will wind up the Griffins.

Clubs
 Art Club
 Game Club
 Key Club
Drama Club

Organizations
Homecoming
 Prom
 SADD
 Student Council
 Year Book
 National Honor Society
 Newspaper
 JROTC
 DECA

References

External links
 Taylor High School

Public high schools in Michigan
Schools in Wayne County, Michigan
2018 establishments in Michigan
Educational institutions established in 2018
Taylor, Michigan